The women's Women's balance beam competitions at the 2013 Mediterranean Games in 
Mersin was held at the Mersin Gymnastics Hall on 24 June 2013.

Format competition

The top eight qualifiers in the qualification phase (limit two per NOC), advanced to the apparatus final. Qualification scores were then ignored, with only final round scores counting.

Schedule
All times are Eastern European Summer Time (UTC+3)

Qualification

* Chiara Gandolfi (ITA) ranked 5th, Elisabetta Preziosa (ITA) ranked 6th, and Monon Cormoreche (FRA) ranked 9th but did not qualify to finals because of the 2-per-country rule.

* Mira Boumejmajen (FRA) ranked 12th respectively but did not qualify as Reserves for this final due to teammates ranked above her.

Final

References

 https://web.archive.org/web/20130623012609/http://info.mersin2013.gov.tr/disiplineDetails_GA.aspx

Gymnastics at the 2013 Mediterranean Games
2013 in women's gymnastics